Angela Sue Jacobs (March 1, 1969 – July 19, 2022) was an American anchor and reporter in Tampa Bay, Florida and a long-time reporter at WFTV Channel 9 in Orlando, Florida. While working as an anchor and reporter in Tampa Bay, she received several awards including two regional Emmy Awards.

She died on July 19, 2022, after a battle with metastatic breast cancer.

Early life 
Jacobs was born in Harrisburg, Pennsylvania, on March 1, 1969, to Richard and Ramona Jacobs.

References 

1969 births
2022 deaths
People from Harrisburg, Pennsylvania